Toyota Park is the former name of a soccer-specific stadium in Bridgeview, Illinois, USA.

Toyota Park may also refer to:

Endeavour Field, Woolooware, New South Wales, Australia (formerly known as Toyota Park)
Toyota Prefectural Natural Park, Yamaguchi, Japan
Toyota Athletic Stadium, Toyota, Aichi, Japan

See also
 Toyota (disambiguation)
 Toyota Stadium (disambiguation)
 Toyota Center (disambiguation)
 Toyota Arena (disambiguation)